The small snakehead (Channa asiatica) is a species of snakehead. It is one of four species of the genus Channa native to China. It also can be found in Taiwan and southern Japan, to which it migrated (or was introduced). It is a medium-sized snakehead which is a nestbuilder (as opposed to the Indian mouthbrooder dwarf snakeheads).

References

External links

 snakeheads.org the comprehensive website for all aspects of snakeheads

Small snakehead
Fish described in 1758
Taxa named by Carl Linnaeus